Barranquenho (English: Barranquian) is a Romance linguistic variety spoken in the Portuguese town of Barrancos, near the Spanish border. It is a mixed language, and can be considered either a variety of Portuguese (Alentejan Portuguese) heavily influenced by the Spanish dialects of neighbouring areas in Spain in Extremadura and Andalusia (especially those from Encinasola and Rosal de la Frontera), or a Spanish dialect (Extremaduran / Andalusian) heavily influenced by Portuguese.

Barranquenho speakers maintain that they speak neither Spanish nor Portuguese but a third language altogether different. Ethnologue lists Barranquenho (as Barranquian) as a dialect of Extremaduran, perhaps because Barrancos was populated by settlers from Badajoz, a city in Extremadura, though not in an Extremaduran language speaking area.

The development of Barranquenho seems to be relatively recent, the variety developing no earlier than 1527 and likely by the early 1800s, unlike other minority linguistic varieties in the Iberian Peninsula, which have medieval roots.

Characteristics

The Portuguese base of this dialect is extremely hidden behind the Spanish dialects that mold it.
Sometimes these letters can be completely muted:  (English: once).

But they appear again in the plural form: . This is due to the influence of Andalusian and Extremaduran Spanish.

The Portuguese form of the first person of the plural, is replaced by  - a variation of the Spanish . The placing of the pronouns is closer to the Spanish norm than to the Portuguese:  (English: was washed).

It also contains many verbal forms of clearly Spanish conjugation:  (Portuguese: ,); .

Barranquenho uses Portuguese definite and indefinite articles, ie . It prefers the Spanish diminutive  to the Portuguese , and it typically uses the present subjunctive for future reference, as in  'when he comes'.

Recognition

On 26 November 2021, the Parliament of Portugal unanimously voted for the approval of a resolution through which Barranquenho was recognized and protected in the municipality.

See also
Iberian languages
Languages of Portugal
Languages of Spain
Iberian Romance languages
Portuñol

References

Bibliography 

 

Languages of Portugal